Albemarle Gallery was an art gallery located in Mayfair, London. The gallery opened in 1986 and featured figurative to hyper-realist artwork by local and international contemporary painters and sculptors. This gallery closed in 1993.

History
In 1986, Mark Glazebrook, a private art dealer with an interest in modern British painting and drawing opened Albemarle Gallery on Piccadilly. The gallery featured over 100 artists in its first three and a half years. The gallery closed in 1993. Glazebrook died in 2009.

References

External links

1986 establishments in England
Art galleries established in 1986
1993 disestablishments in England
1996 establishments in England
Art galleries established in 1996
Contemporary art galleries in London
Defunct art galleries in London